Tulio de Oliveira is a Brazilian, Portuguese, and South African permanent resident professor of bioinformatics at the University of KwaZulu-Natal and Stellenbosch University, South Africa, and associate professor of global health at the University of Washington. He has studied outbreaks of chikungunya, dengue, hepatitis B and C, HIV, SARS-CoV-2, yellow fever and Zika. During the COVID-19 pandemic he led the team that confirmed the discovery of the Beta variant of the COVID-19 virus in 2020 and the Omicron variant in 2021. 

He gained fellowships to Oxford University, Wellcome Trust Sanger Institute, and Edinburgh University, and in 2015 was appointed professor. In 2017, he founded the KwaZulu-Natal Research Innovation and Sequencing Platform (KRISP) and in 2021 he founded the Centre for Epidemic Response and Innovation (CERI), to sequence and trace epidemics.

Early life
De Oliveira was born in Brazil. He earned a bachelor of science degree from the Federal University of Rio Grande do Sul in Brazil. He completed his MSc and PhD at the Nelson R Mandela School of Medicine, University of KwaZulu-Natal.

Career
During his career he has studied outbreaks of chikungunya, dengue, hepatitis B and C, HIV, SARS-CoV-2, yellow fever and Zika.

From 2004 to 2006 he was a Marie Curie research fellow at Oxford University. In 2015 he was a Newton advanced fellow at the Wellcome Trust Sanger Institute at Edinburgh University and in the same year was appointed professor of bioinformatics at University of KwaZulu-Natal. There, in 2017, he founded KwaZulu-Natal Research Innovation and Sequencing Platform (KRISP), which has sequenced and traced dengue, Zika, HIV and tuberculosis, in addition to SARS-CoV-2. In 2018, the year prior to completing his fellowship at Edinburgh, he was appointed as an associate professor of Global Health at the University of Washington. In July 2021, he became a professor of bioinformatics at Stellenbosch University's School for Data Science and Computational Thinking.

During the COVID-19 pandemic he led the team that confirmed the discovery of the Beta variant of the COVID-19 virus in late 2020. He has hypothesised that large groups of previously-infected people with declining immunity directly drive the emergence of variants of concern. If simultaneously there is a high level of transmission, then declining individual immunity may fail to prevent re-infection and if the virus is not cleared in enough people, new dangerous mutations may become more likely, as the virus survives and goes on to infect more people. Subsequently, as principal investigator and leader of the Network for Genomic Surveillance in South Africa, he led the team that confirmed and alerted authorities of the Omicron variant, first sequenced in Johannesburg's Lancet Laboratory, as a new variant in 2021. After first alerting authorities to the Omicron variant in South Africa, de Oliveira contended that the origin is unknown; he has "insisted that just because it was first detected in South Africa doesn't mean that's where it originated". He reported that it was possible that Omicron came from elsewhere as O. R. Tambo International Airport, Johannesburg, was the largest in Africa.

Recognition and awards
De Oliveira was included in a list of ten scientists with important roles in scientific developments in 2021 compiled by the scientific journal ''Nature.
De Oliveira was included in a list of the leader of genomics surveillance as one of the ten breakthrough technologies in 2022 compiled by the scientific journal ''MIT_Technology_Review.
He received the Gold Medal Award from the South African Medical Research Council (SAMRC) in 2022.
In the same year, for his contributions to society, he received the Batho Pele Award from the Government of South Africa.

Further reading

External links

Living people
Year of birth missing (living people)
Bioinformaticians
University of Natal alumni
Federal University of Rio Grande do Sul alumni
Brazilian scientists
Brazilian emigrants to South Africa
University of KwaZulu-Natal alumni
Academic staff of the University of KwaZulu-Natal
Academic staff of Stellenbosch University
University of Washington faculty

References